Mukhaestate is a village located in the west part of Georgia, in the Kobuleti municipality in the Adjarian region (an autonomous region). The village sits at 60 metres above sea level, near the Achkva River. According to 2014 data, 2,045 people live in the village. During the 15th-16th century, Mukhaestate was the main place of residence for nobleman from Guria region. Mukhaestate is 36.9 kilometers north of Batumi and approximately 315 km west of the nation's capital, Tbilisi. The mountainous area is good for subtropical species.

History of Church
St. George's church is said to have been a small church in the village, and the only place where the local population could pray. Built of ancient rock, the church was destroyed in 1891.

Mukhaestate is said to be a famous village in the Kobuleti Municipality. The people of Mukhaestate produce three types of citrus fruit. The village is also said to be known for its traditions, hospitality, climatic areas and ionized maritime air.

Notable people
 Nino Katamadze - is a famous Georgian jazz singer and artist.
 Jano Ananidze - is a Georgian professional footballer who plays as an attacking midfielder for Spartak Moscow in the Russian Premier League.

See also
 Adjara

References

https://www.google.at/maps/place/Mukhaestate,+Georgia/@41.8414892,41.7927218,12z/data=!4m5!3m4!1s0x405d714b17a09079:0x662da149e02e5a13!8m2!3d41.8418746!4d41.8631441
http://geostat.ge/cms/site_images/_files/georgian/census/2002/II%20tomi%20.pdf
http://kobuleti.org.ge/index.php?lang=en

Populated places in Kobuleti Municipality